"Set U Free" is a 1995 hit single by techno music duo Planet Soul, co-written by Nadine Renee and George Acosta. The single was produced by Acosta and reached its peak of 26 on the Billboard Hot 100 on January 27, 1996.

The song is in the key of F♯/G♭with a BPM of 128.

Charts

Weekly charts

Year-end charts

References

1995 singles
1996 singles
1995 songs
Strictly Rhythm singles